Mihai Cotorobai (25 March 1951 – 6 January 2021) was a Moldovan politician.

Biography
He served as member of the Parliament of Moldova.

Cotorobai died on 6 January 2021, after contracting COVID-19 during the COVID-19 pandemic in Moldova.

References

External links
 Cine au fost şi ce fac deputaţii primului Parlament din R. Moldova (1990-1994)?
 Declaraţia deputaţilor din primul Parlament
 Site-ul Parlamentului Republicii Moldova

2021 deaths
Moldovan MPs 1990–1994
Popular Front of Moldova MPs
Deaths from the COVID-19 pandemic in Moldova
1951 births